The 7th Kisei was the seventh edition of the Kisei Go tournament, played in 1983. Since Fujisawa Hideyuki won the previous year, he is given an automatic place in the final. Eight players battled in a knockout tournament to decide the final 2. Those two would then play each other in a best-of-3 match to decide who would face Fujisawa. Cho Chikun became the challenger after beating Kato Masao 2 games to 0, and went on to beat Fujisawa 4 games to 3 to become the new Kisei.

Main tournament

Challenger finals

Finals

References 

Kisei (Go)
1983 in go